Fire-retardant materials are designed to burn slowly.

Fire-retardant materials should not be confused with fire-resistant materials. A fire resistant material is one which is designed to resist burning and withstand heat. An example of a fire-resistant material is one which is used in bunker gear worn by firefighters to protect them from the flames of a burning building.

In the United Kingdom, after two significant construction fires which resulted in a combined loss of £1,500 million, The Joint Code of Practice was introduced by the Fire Protection Association (FPA), the UK's national fire safety organisation, to prevent fires on buildings undergoing construction work. The Joint Code of Practice provides advice on how to prevent fires such as through the use of flame-retardant temporary protection materials: for example, some high quality floor protectors are designed to burn slowly and prevent the spread of fires.

Fire-retardant materials used in buildings
Mineral wool
Gypsum boards
Asbestos cement
Perlite boards
Corriboard
Calcium silicate 
Sodium silicate
Potassium silicate 
Treated lumber plywood
Treated vegetable fiber (e.g., cotton, jute, kenaf, hemp, flax, etc..)
Fire-retardant treated wood
Brick
Concrete
Cement render
Intumescent paint
Glass
Magnesium oxide (MgO)
Geobond asbestos substitute

Fire textiles
PBI
Aramid - para and meta
Flame retardant cotton
Coated nylon
Carbon foam (CFOAM)
Melamine
Modacrylic

Phasing-out
Many common brominated flame retardants are being phased-out by manufacturers.

See also 
Fireproof
Non-flammable

References

External links 
 European Flame Retardants Association EFRA brings together and represents the leading organisations which manufacture, market or use flame retardants in Europe. 

Engineering-related lists

Flame retardants
Materials science